Venice is an unincorporated community and census-designated place in Plaquemines Parish, Louisiana, United States. As of the 2020 census, its population was 162. It is the last community down the Mississippi accessible by automobile, and it is the southern terminus of the Great River Road. This has earned the town the nickname "The end of the world." The ZIP code for Venice is 70091.

In 2001, the combined population for Venice and the neighboring communities of Orchard (often considered a part of Venice) and Boothville, Louisiana, was about 2,740 people, with about 975 families. About 460 of those people lived in Venice.

Venice has a diverse variety of fish. It is known as the starting point for many doing offshore fishing, who then head to Port Eads. Its main offshore rival is nearby Grand Isle.

History

In 1969, Venice was almost completely destroyed by Hurricane Camille. The pressure fell below 950 hPa, with winds over 100 miles per hour. The community would be devastated again 36 years later by Hurricane Katrina.

In 2000, a deck hand on a shrimp boat was accused of the murder of his captain, whose body was discovered a few days after a storm on the Gulf of Mexico. The media, including newspapers in the city, discovered that the man had been coerced into making a false confession, and he was eventually acquitted. 

Venice was again almost completely destroyed by Hurricane Katrina in 2005. Since then, significant reconstruction, reopening, and reoccupation has taken place. The high bridge leading to Venice was not destroyed during the hurricane.

In late April 2010, Venice faced an environmental disaster when oil from the Deepwater Horizon oil spill began washing ashore in the community.

Geography

Demographics

Industry
Local industries include commercial and sport fishing, as well as service and transport for off-shore petroleum platforms.

Education
Plaquemines Parish School Board operates the public schools of the parish.

It is served by Boothville-Venice Elementary School in Boothville and South Plaquemines High School in Buras. Prior to 2005 Boothville-Venice High School (PreK-12) served the community, but Hurricane Katrina damaged the original building.

Plaquemines Parish is in the service area of Nunez Community College.

References

External links

 Boothville-Venice Elementary School

Census-designated places in Louisiana
Unincorporated communities in Louisiana
Census-designated places in Plaquemines Parish, Louisiana
Census-designated places in New Orleans metropolitan area
Louisiana populated places on the Mississippi River
Unincorporated communities in Plaquemines Parish, Louisiana